The 2013 Grand Prix of Baltimore, the third running of the event, was an IndyCar Series race held on September 1, 2013 on the streets of Baltimore, Maryland. The race was the sixteenth of the 2013 IndyCar Series season, and was the final running of the Grand Prix of Baltimore. Scott Dixon started on the pole position, while Simon Pagenaud of Sam Schmidt Motorsports won the race.

Background
The previous race in the season, the GoPro Indy Grand Prix of Sonoma, was won by Will Power. The winner of the previous race was Ryan Hunter-Reay.

In the season, James Hinchcliffe and Scott Dixon were tied for the most wins with three. In the points race, Hélio Castroneves held the points lead with 479 points, followed by Dixon (440), Ryan Hunter-Reay (417), Marco Andretti (409), and Simon Pagenaud (380) rounded out the top five.

Qualifying
Will Power, Simon Pagenaud, Justin Wilson and Josef Newgarden filled out the top five starting spots. Tristan Vautier, Hélio Castroneves, Ryan Hunter-Reay, Charlie Kimball, and Takuma Sato filled out the bottom half of the top ten.

Race
The race was marred by six cautions, five of which took place between laps 41 and 65, the lone exception occurring on lap 13 with Ed Carpenter's car stopping in turn 5 and Luca Filippi leaving the track in turn 3 due to a fire in the engine compartment. On lap 41, Stefan Wilson hit the turn 7 wall, while seven laps later, Scott Dixon was spun by Graham Rahal in turn 1. Five laps later, Will Power collided with Dixon and was sent spinning into the wall, and four laps later, Oriol Servia and Sebastian Bourdais also touched, and the latter was turned. On lap 63, six cars were involved in an accident. Also during the race, Hélio Castroneves was black-flagged for a safety violation.  Meanwhile, Simon Pagenaud was able to take the lead and hold off Josef Newgarden to win with a four-second advantage, his second victory of the year. Bourdais finished third, Justin Wilson and Simona de Silvestro closed out the top five; Charlie Kimball, James Hinchcliffe, Sebastián Saavedra, Castroneves and Marco Andretti rounded out the top ten.

After the race, Castroneves continued to lead the points standings with 501 points. Dixon was 49 points behind with 452, while Pagenaud took third with 431. Andretti and Ryan Hunter-Reay were in fourth and fifth with 430 and 427 points, respectively. Wilson (393), Dario Franchitti (388), Hinchcliffe (376), Will Power (371), and Kimball (363) finished the top ten in points.

References

Baltimore Grand Prix
Grand Prix of Baltimore
Grand Prix of Baltimore
Grand Prix of Baltimore
2010s in Baltimore